The following is an episode list for The Ricky Gervais Show, which was at one time credited as the most-downloaded podcast ever, with "nearly 8 million" downloads, according to the BBC. This record was set several years before podcasting had become a mainstream medium, and thus Gervais and his team are often considered trailblazers for the medium. The series stars Ricky Gervais and Stephen Merchant of The Office and Extras fame, as well as Karl Pilkington. The series began as a free feature on the website of The Guardian, but a cost was added when the series was marketed by Audible for the second and third series.

Podcasts / Audiobooks

Series 1

Radio 2 Holiday Shows

Gervais, Merchant and Pilkington broadcast two hour-long holiday specials on Radio 2 during the 2005 holiday season, the first airing on Christmas Eve and the second on New Year's Eve.

Series 2

Series 3

The Podfather (Series 4)

Fame special

A special podcast was made available as a giveaway to people that went to see Gervais' standup tour Fame. On 12 October 2007 this was made available as a free download to the general public, via the same subscription as the video podcasts.

Hour Long Bonus Podcast

Originally released as an extra on the audio CD release of series one, it was later made available free through iTunes.

NME Radio Show

Ricky, Steve and Karl recorded a two-hour radio show as part of the test transmissions for the new radio station NME Radio. This was recorded on Thursday 5 June in London and premiered on Monday 9 June 2008, 12 pm (BST).

Series 5
Four episodes of season five were released on 15 September 2008 through the iTunes Store.

The Ricky Gervais Guide to... 
The latest series starring Gervais, Merchant and Pilkington is called The Ricky Gervais Guide to...

Series 1

Series 2

A Day in the Life of Karl

A special one-off podcast where Ricky, Steve and Karl discuss a day in the life of Karl.

Video podcasts

Specials
Several special video podcasts have been released, most of which to promote Ricky's Fame tour.

Television series

The Ricky Gervais Show podcasts and audiobooks have been developed into The Ricky Gervais animated television series, produced for and broadcast by American channel HBO. The TV series consists of audio from past podcasts and audiobooks, with animation drawn in a style similar to classic era Hanna-Barbera cartoons, presenting jokes and situations in a literal context.

The animated Ricky Gervais Show has aired three 13-episode series since it premiered in the United States on 19 February 2010. The third series started on 20 April 2012. On 16 June 2012, Ricky Gervais announced he has decided not to do a fourth season. All three series have been released on DVD, and the entire series has been made available in HD from streaming services, including Amazon Prime.

See also
The Ricky Gervais Show
Ricky Gervais
Stephen Merchant
Karl Pilkington

References

External links
The Ricky Gervais Show
Pilkipedia – Karl Pilkington wiki

Lists of podcast episodes
The Guardian
Ricky Gervais